The Blackwell channel is a deterministic broadcast channel model used in coding theory and information theory. It was first proposed by mathematician David Blackwell. In this model, a transmitter transmits one of three symbols to two receivers. For two of the symbols, both receivers receive exactly what was sent; the third symbol, however, is received differently at each of the receivers. This is one of the simplest examples of a non-trivial capacity result for a non-stochastic channel.

Definition 
The Blackwell channel is composed of one input (transmitter) and two outputs (receivers). The channel input is ternary (three symbols) and is selected from {0, 1, 2}. This symbol is broadcast to the receivers; that is, the transmitter sends one symbol simultaneously to both receivers. Each of the channel outputs is binary (two symbols), labeled {0, 1}.

Whenever a 0 is sent, both outputs receive a 0. Whenever a 1 is sent, both outputs receive a 1. When a 2 is sent, however, the first output is 0 and the second output is 1. Therefore, the symbol 2 is confused by each of the receivers in a different way.

The operation of the channel is memoryless and completely deterministic.

Capacity of the Blackwell channel 
The capacity of the channel was found by S. I. Gel'fand. It is defined by the region:
 1. R1 = 1, 0 ≤ R2 ≤ 
 2. R1 = H(a), R2 = 1 − a, for  ≤ a ≤ 
 3. R1 + R2 = log2 3, log2 3 -  ≤ R1  ≤ 
 4. R1 = 1 − a, R2 = H(a), for  ≤ a ≤ 
 5. 0 ≤ R1 ≤ , R2 = 1

A solution was also found by Pinkser et al. (1995).

References 

Coding theory